The Tyrrell 014 was a Formula One car, designed for Tyrrell Racing by Maurice Philippe for use in the  season. The cars were powered by the turbocharged Renault EF4B V6 engine.

The car was successor of the 012, which was powered by naturally aspirated Ford Cosworth DFY V8 engine. The team was in fact the last to secure a turbocharged engine deal. The development of the new car was, however, halted due to the lack of funding (after their exclusion from the  season the team lost not only their points, but the money from TV rights and more) and the team used the 012 with Cosworth DFY in it for the first half of the season. The 014 made its debut on the 1985 French Grand Prix. During the season the team scored only 3 points in the 1985 Australian Grand Prix by Ivan Capelli.

The car raced also in the first two races  of the  season, before being replaced by the Tyrrell 015.

Complete Formula One results
(key)

* 9 points scored using the Tyrrell 015 at the 1986 Monaco Grand Prix

Notes

Tyrrell Formula One cars